Abraham Ramiro Bentes (1912 – 1990) was a Brazilian Army commander and linguist.

Born in Itaituba, Pará State in Northern Brazil, he was the offspring of Jewish immigrants from Morocco. Bentes joined the Brazilian Army in the 1930s, specializing in antiaircraft artillery and coastal defense. After a long and distinguished career, he achieved the rank of four-star general and was the inspector-general of the Army. After retirement from active service, he became involved in Jewish community affairs in Rio de Janeiro, serving as president of the Shel Guemilut congregation and as an officer of the Clube Hebraica. General Bentes also wrote extensively about the history of the Sephardi community in Brazil and their language.

Works 

 Os Sefardim e a Hakitia (1981)
 Das Ruinas de Jerusalem a Verdejante Amazonia: Formacao da 1a.Comunidade Israelíta Brasileira (1987)
 Primeira comunidade israelita brasileira : tradições, genealogia, pré-história (1989)

References 

1912 births
1990 deaths
Brazilian Sephardi Jews
People from Pará
Brazilian people of Moroccan-Jewish descent
Linguists from Brazil
20th-century linguists